The 1993 NAIA Men's Division I Basketball Tournament was held in March at Kemper Arena in Kansas City, Missouri. The 56th annual NAIA basketball tournament featured 32 teams playing in a single-elimination format. 1993 marked the last time NAIA Division 1 Tournament was conducted at Kemper Arena.

Awards and honors
Leading scorers: 
Leading rebounder: 
Player of the Year: est. 1994.

1993 NAIA bracket

  * denotes overtime.

See also
1993 NAIA Division II men's basketball tournament
1993 NCAA Division I men's basketball tournament
1993 NCAA Division II men's basketball tournament
1993 NCAA Division III men's basketball tournament
1993 NAIA Division I women's basketball tournament

References

Tournament
NAIA Division I men's basketball tournament
NAIA Division I men's basketball tournament
NAIA Men's Basketball Championship